The Ensemble Studio Theatre (EST) is a non-profit membership-based developmental theatre located in Hell's Kitchen, New York City. It has a dual mission of nurturing individual theatre artists and developing new American plays.

Overview

The Ensemble Studio Theatre — commonly known as “EST”— was founded in 1968 by Curt Dempster. With 589 ensemble artists concentrated mainly in New York City, EST has been under the artistic direction of William Carden since 2007.

EST hosts three groups of playwrights: Youngblood, EST's OBIE-winning collective of emerging professional playwrights under the age of 30; the EST Playwrights Unit, a diverse group of playwrights that comprises both EST members and non-members; and Going to the River, a group of women playwrights of color with distinct and powerful voices. EST also cultivates the development of plays during a three-week annual tenure as the resident theater company of the Southampton Writers Conference, in partnership with the SUNY Stony Brook's MFA summer playwriting program.

EST has presented its new, short play festival, the Marathon of One-Act Plays, annually for over thirty years, and it is a public forum for new works by both well-established and up-and-coming writers. The Marathon has been credited for reviving the one-act play form, inspiring many similar festivals across the country. Past playwrights include Horton Foote, Tina Howe, David Mamet, Shirley Lauro, Jaquelyn Reingold, and José Rivera.

Since 1968, EST has produced over 6,000 new works. It produces approximately 150 projects each year, ranging from fully produced mainstage productions to a variety of in-progress workshops and readings.

Membership
EST has a membership of over 600 theatre artists, including playwrights, directors, actors, designers and managers.

Notable EST Member Artists

 David Auburn
 Annie Baker
 Bob Balaban
 Lewis Black
 Geneva Carr
 Catherine Curtin
 Dane DeHaan
 Danny DeVito
 Lucy DeVito
 Christopher Durang
 John Guare
 William Jackson Harper
 Lucas Hnath
 Tina Howe
 William H. Macy
 David Mamet
 Gates McFadden
 Qui Nguyen
 Sarah Jessica Parker
 Austin Pendleton
 José Rivera
 John Patrick Shanley
 Grant Shaud
 Shel Silverstein
 Lois Smith
 Jon Voight
 Wendy Wasserstein
 Claudia Weill
 Ming Na Wen
 Leah Nanako Winkler
 Jerry Zaks
 Anna Ziegler
 Nitya Vidyasagar

EST Youngblood
Youngblood is Ensemble Studio Theatre's collective of emerging professional playwrights under the age of 30. Founded in 1993.

Plays by current and former Youngblood playwrights have been performed at The Royal Court Theatre, Lincoln Center, Playwrights Horizons, Second Stage, Actors Theatre of Louisville, the Mark Taper Forum, the Vineyard Theater, the Atlantic Theater Company and Rattlestick Playwrights Theater, including award winners such as Annie Baker's The Aliens and Amy Herzog's 4000 Miles, and have been adapted by film and television companies, including alumni Lucy Alibar's Juicy and Delicious which was adapted into the film Beasts of The Southern Wild.

Youngblood is currently run by Co-Artistic Directors Graeme Gillis and RJ Tolan.

Notable Youngblood Alumni

Robert Askins
Annie Baker
Amy Herzog
Mike Lew
Qui Nguyen
Christopher Shinn
Lucy Thurber
Leah Nanako Winkler

References

Theatres in Manhattan
Off-Off-Broadway
Hell's Kitchen, Manhattan

ja:ヴィニヤード・シアター